The Long March 11, or Chang Zheng 11 as in pinyin, abbreviated LM-11 for export or CZ-11 within China (and designated 11H when launched from sea), is a Chinese four stage solid-propellant carrier rocket of the Long March family, which is developed by the China Aerospace Science and Technology Corporation. It was designed with the ability to launch on short notice and it can launch from road vehicles (CZ-11) and ships (CZ-11H). It is likely based on the DF-31 missile. The vehicle can be cold launched from a launch tube mounted on a road mobile vehicle.

The maiden flight of the Long March 11 occurred on 25 September 2015.
The first sea launch occurred on 5 June 2019, from a converted barge stationed in the Yellow Sea. Sixteen launches have been made , four of them from sea.

Launch Statistics

List of launches

References

Long March (rocket family)
Vehicles introduced in 2015
2015 in China
2015 in technology
Projects established in 2015